The SAE Institute (SAE, formerly the School of Audio Engineering and the SAE Technology College) provides creative media programmes at four UK campuses in London, Liverpool, Leamington Spa, and Glasgow, providing industry-focused 2-year degrees validated by the University of Hertfordshire across eight subject areas – Audio, Content Creation & Online Marketing, Film, Game Art Animation, Games Programming, Music Business, Visual Effects, and Web Development. It was founded in 1976 in Sydney by Tom Misner.

History
SAE was established by Tom Misner in 1976 in Sydney, converting a small advertising studio into a classroom. Over the next six years, campuses in Melbourne, Brisbane, Adelaide and Perth were established. In the mid-1980s, SAE began opening colleges outside of Australia, including locations in London, Munich, Frankfurt, Vienna, Berlin, Auckland, and Glasgow. In the 1990s, SAE opened a European head office in Amsterdam, and locations were opened in Paris, Hamburg, Zürich, Hobart, Cologne, Stockholm, Athens, and Milan. SAE also began expanding into Asia in the 1990s, opening locations in Singapore and Kuala Lumpur. In the late 1990s, SAE formed the SAE Entertainment Company and launched full university degree programs with the co-operation of Southern Cross University and Middlesex University. In 1999, SAE began opening facilities in the United States, and over the following decade opened locations in Nashville, Miami, San Francisco, Atlanta, Los Angeles, and Chicago. In 2000, SAE began licensing franchise schools in India, opening four that year. In 2000s, locations were opened in Liverpool, Madrid, Brussels, Bangkok, Leipzig, Barcelona, Dubai, Amman, Cape Town, Istanbul, and Serbia. Licence agreements were signed for new schools in Qatar, Bogotá Colombia, Mexico, Saudi Arabia and Egypt. The Dubai branch offers degree certification accredited by Middlesex University. In the 2000s SAE also acquired QANTM, an Australian production, media and training company, and relocated its head office to Littlemore Park, Oxford and its headquarters to Byron Bay, Australia.

In 2010, the SAE Institute was sold to Navitas, a publicly traded educational services company. Over the next few years, new locations were opened in Romania, Jakarta, and Moskhato. Navitas began taking over the US campuses in 2011, and laid off over 40 US employees in 2014.

SAE Online

SAE Online, formerly SAE Graduate college, was an unaccredited, distance learning, proprietary, for-profit European school that offered post graduate courses from master's degrees to PhDs in Creative Media Industries, as well as several other professional skills courses (short courses). SAE Online has since ceased operations.

Energy Groove Radio
Energy Groove Radio is a digital commercial-style radio network. It is a network of eight Contemporary Hit Radio (CHR)/Top 40 Stations playing a mix of live and pre-recorded programming.

Energy Groove Radio showcases local and international shows, produced by a mix of DJs, presenters, and SAE students.

Freddy El Turk launched Energy Groove Radio in 2009, broadcasting from Sydney, Australia. Since partnering with SAE in 2011, Energy Groove Radio has grown from a single digital radio service - based in Australia at the SAE Sydney campus - to a network of seven stations located across the UK, France, Italy, Germany, US and Spain.

In 2012 Energy Groove and Emirates Airlines entered a collaboration which now sees Emirates Airlines play Energy Groove Radio across its entire fleet.

Partnerships with other institutions
SAE is accredited in Australia and South Africa to award its own Bachelor and Masters degrees and awards degrees in Europe and at Licensed campuses via its partnerships with Middlesex University. Since 2013, SAE Germany offers a Master of Arts in Professional Media Creation through a partnership with the Institut für Computermusik und Elektronische Medien (Institute for Computer Music and Electronic Media) of Folkwang University of the Arts.

SAE Institute is a validated partner of Middlesex University in London. Students enrolled in a validated programme will receive a Middlesex award on successful completion of their studies. All BA and BSc programmes are validated by Middlesex University.

SAE Institute has undergone a review for educational oversight by the Quality Assurance Agency for Higher Education (QAA).

SAE Institute became an associate member of GuildHE in July 2013, one of the two recognised representative bodies for higher education in the UK.

Sponsorship
SAE sponsors the national unsigned music competition Top of the Ox, recently won by singer-songwriter Ian Edwards, in association with Oxford based record label Crash Records and other organisations.

Notable alumni
 Kriesi
 Mark Paterson – Oscar and BAFTA winner for the 2012 film Les Misérables
 David Donaldson – 2005 Grammy Award winner for the film Ray
 Rob Swire of Pendulum and Knife Party
 Nigel Godrich
 Pritom Ahmed
 Habib Wahid
 Pi'erre Bourne
 Pogo
 Thomas Juth
 Sampa the Great
 Shabareesh Varma, Musician
 Mahesh Raghvan

References

Further reading

External links
 Official website

Audio engineering schools
Audio engineering
Australian tertiary institutions
Organisations based in Oxford